Gordon R. Friedman is a performance auditor for the city of Portland, Oregon. He was a reporter for The Oregonian from 2016-19 and covered Portland City Hall and Oregon's state government. He was also a reporter at the Statesman Journal.

Friedman grew up in California and Washington, and then attended the University of Oregon where he majored in journalism. While in college, served as editor-in-chief of Ethos, the campus magazine. While editor, he led the publication to win a Pacemaker Award from the Associated Collegiate Press. Friedman also worked at The Daily Emerald.

After graduating college in 2015, Friedman began working at the Statesman Journal, in Salem. In 2016, his coverage of the Malheur National Wildlife Refuge standoff for USA Today and an investigation into officer misconduct in Oregon prisons earned him the Rookie of the Year Award from the Society of Professional Journalists, Oregon Territory Chapter. In 2016 he was hired by The Oregonian as a state capitol bureau reporter. He later moved on to covering Portland City Hall.

Friedman lives in Portland, Oregon.

References

External links

Ethos Magazine - www.ethosmagonline.com
Personal Website - http://www.grfriedman.com/

1993 births
Living people
Writers from Eugene, Oregon